María Isabel Verdú Rollán (born 2 October 1970), better known as Maribel Verdú, is a Spanish actress. She has received numerous accolades throughout her career spanning near four decades, including two Goya Awards for Best Actress out of eleven nominations, the Gold Medal of the Academy of Cinematographic Arts and Sciences of Spain in 2008 and the National Cinematography Award presented by the Spanish Ministry of Culture in 2009.

Verdú made her acting debut at the age of thirteen in Captain Sánchez's Crime (1985). Some of her film credits include performances in Lovers (1991), Belle Époque (1992), Y tu mamá también (2001), Pan's Labyrinth (2006), The Blind Sunflowers (2008), Tetro (2009), Snow White (2012) and Raymond & Ray (2022). She will appear in the upcoming DC Extended Universe film The Flash as Nora Allen.

Early life
Verdú was born in Madrid, Spain. She began acting at 13, appearing in various commercials. She left school at the age of 15, so that she could fully devote herself to her acting career. Verdú has appeared in more than 60 movies, since 1984, the majority of them in Spanish. She has also been in numerous TV shows.

Career

Her first work experience was as a model in spots and fashion magazines by known commercial firms. Her first television opportunity was given to her at the age of 13, featuring in the anthology series , directed by Vicente Aranda in the episode "Captain Sánchez's Crime".

She made her feature film debut in El sueño de Tánger at age 14, starring alongside Fabio Testi. Shot in 1985, the film underwent a production hell, and was not released until 1991. Her first appearance in a theatrical release was thus in the 1986 film El orden cómico.

27 Hours, by Montxo Armendáriz, about a girl who is a drug addict, was one of the most powerful experiences in her life, up to that point. After this film, other more important films started coming her way, including Hostages in the Barrio by Eloy de la Iglesia and Year of Enlightment (El Año de las Luces) by Fernando Trueba.

Later, Verdú said that her role in Lovers marked a turning point in her screen career and has brought about a maturity as a performer.  Thereafter, she worked with such directors as José Luis Garci in Cradle Song (Canción de cuna); Bigas Luna in Golden Balls (Huevos de Oro); again with Trueba in the Academy Award winner Belle Époque; Emilio Martínez-Lázaro in Carreteras Secundarias; Carlos Saura in Goya in Bordeaux (Goya en Burdeos); and Gonzalo Suárez in El Portero and Oviedo Express. On the international stage, her career hit a highpoint when she starred in Y tu mamá también by Alfonso Cuarón, followed by Pan's Labyrinth by Guillermo del Toro.  Verdú was subsequently invited to be a part of the academy in Hollywood.

In 2010, Maribel starred in a music video, named Lola Soledad (Lola Loneliness), by 16-time Latin Grammy Awards winner Alejandro Sanz.

She made her theater debut in 1986, starring as the character of Julieta and has since then combined theater with cinema.  She has also intertwined the two in television shows, such as Turno de Oficio and Segunda Enseñanza.

In March 2021, she was cast as Barry Allen/The Flash's mother Nora Allen on the upcoming DC Extended Universe film The Flash, due to be released on June 16, 2023.

Personal life
Verdú married Pedro Larrañaga on 2 September 1999. He is the son of actors Carlos Larrañaga and María Luisa Merlo. Verdú is the stockholder of the clinic Premium in Estepona.

Filmography

Film

Television

Accolades

Lifetime achievements
 Gold Medal of the Academy of Cinematographic Arts and Sciences of Spain in 2008.
 National Cinematography Award by the Spanish Ministry of Culture in 2009.

References

External links

1970 births
Living people
20th-century Spanish actresses
21st-century Spanish actresses
Actresses from Madrid
Ariel Award winners
Best Actress Goya Award winners
Spanish child actresses
Spanish film actresses
Spanish television actresses